La Planche is a commune in the Loire-Atlantique department in the Pays de la Loire region in western France.

It is situated at 25 km (16 miles) south of Nantes. The 1973 Nantes mid-air collision took place above La Planche.

Population

Culture
In La Planche, the Musée de la chanson française has been established in 1992. The goal of the museum, to remember the artists that have established the heritage of the chanson.

See also
Communes of the Loire-Atlantique department

References

Communes of Loire-Atlantique